Evergreen, one of the James River Plantations is a historic plantation house located just east of Hopewell, in Prince George County, Virginia. It was built about 1807 by planter, George Ruffin, and is a two-story, five-bay, Late Georgian / Federal style stuccoed brick dwelling.  It sits on a high basement and has a hipped roof.  The front facade features a one-story pedimented Doric order portico set on a brick podium.  George Ruffin's son, ardent secessionist Edmund Ruffin, who is credited with firing one of the first shots at Fort Sumter at the start of the Civil War was born at Evergreen in 1794.  The house was extensively renovated in the late-1930s, after prior use as a barn and stable.

Evergreen was listed on the National Register of Historic Places in 2002.

References

Houses on the National Register of Historic Places in Virginia
Plantation houses in Virginia
Houses in Prince George County, Virginia
Federal architecture in Virginia
Houses completed in 1807
National Register of Historic Places in Prince George County, Virginia